Jacobus Johannes "Coos" Cremers (15 December 1806, Groningen - 5 March 1882, Groningen) was a Dutch politician.

References
Mr. J.J. (Coos) Cremers at parlement.com

1806 births
1882 deaths
Members of the Senate (Netherlands)
University of Groningen alumni
Politicians from Groningen (city)